The 2017 ACB Playoffs, also known as 2017 Liga Endesa Playoffs for sponsorship reasons, was the postseason tournament of the ACB's 2016–17 season, which began September 30, 2016. The playoffs started on 20 May 2017, and ended on 16 June 2017 with the Finals.

Real Madrid was the defending champion, but lost the title to Valencia Basket in the finals, who won its first league ever.

Format
At the end of the regular season, the eight teams with the most wins qualify for the playoffs. The seedings are based on each team's record.

The bracket is fixed; there is no reseeding. The quarterfinals are best-of-three series; the team that has two wins advances to the next round. This round is in a 1–1–1 format. From the semifinals onward, the rounds are best-of-five series; the team that has three wins advances to the next round. These rounds, including the Finals, are in a 2–2–1 format. Home court advantage in any round belong to the higher-seeded team.

Playoff qualifying
On 9 April 2017, Real Madrid became the first team to clinch a playoff spot.

Bracket
Teams in bold advanced to the next round. The numbers to the left of each team indicate the team's seeding, and the numbers to the right indicate the result of games including result in bold of the team that won in that game.

Quarterfinals
All times were in Central European Summer Time (UTC+02:00)

Real Madrid v MoraBanc Andorra

This was the first meeting in the playoffs between Real Madrid and MoraBanc Andorra.

Baskonia v Herbalife Gran Canaria

This was the fifth playoff meeting between these two teams, with Baskonia winning three of the four meetings.

Valencia Basket v FC Barcelona Lassa

This was the fifth playoff meeting between these two teams, with FC Barcelona Lassa winning the previous four meetings.

Unicaja v Iberostar Tenerife

This was the first meeting in the playoffs between Unicaja and Iberostar Tenerife.

Semifinals
All times were in Central European Summer Time (UTC+02:00)

Real Madrid v Unicaja

This was the fourth playoff meeting between these two teams, with Real Madrid winning two of the three meetings

Baskonia v Valencia Basket

This was the fourth playoff meeting between these two teams, with Baskonia winning the previous three meetings.

Finals
All times were in Central European Summer Time (UTC+02:00)

This was the fifth playoff meeting between these two teams, with Real Madrid winning the previous four meetings.

References

External links
Playoffs official website
Playoffs news

2017
playoffs